The Ankogel Group is a sub-group of the Central Eastern Alps. Together with the Goldberg Group, the Glockner Group, the Schober Group, the Kreuzeck Group, the Granatspitze Group, the Venediger Group, the Villgraten Mountains and the Rieserferner Group it forms the mountain range of the Hohe Tauern (High Tauern).

The Ankogel Group is located in the Austrian federal states of Salzburg and Carinthia. Its highest peak is the Hochalmspitze,  (11,020 ft).

Geography
The Ankogel Group is the easternmost mountain group of the High Tauern and lies on the main chain of the Alps. The Lower Tauern begin further east. The range gets its name from the Ankogel mountain. .

The Ankogel Group can be further divided into the sub-groups of the Ankogel Massif, the Hochalmspitze Group, the Hafner Group and the Reißeck Group south of the Möll Valley. It comprises the picturesque Maltatal ("valley of falling waters") with the Fallbach Waterfall and the Kölnbrein Dam.

Neighbouring ranges
The Ankogel Group borders on the following other mountain ranges in the Eastern Alps:
 Goldberg Group (in the west)
 Kreuzeck Group (in the southwest)
(both also part of the High Tauern)
 Salzburg Slate Alps, lying north of the Salzach River
 Radstädter Tauern, lying northeast of the Mur River
 Nock Mountains, lying beyond the Lieser Valley in the east
 Gailtal Alps, south of the Drava,
part of the Southern Limestone Alps.

Peaks 
All the named three-thousanders in the Ankogel Group:
 

Hochalmspitze 
Großelendkopf 
Großer Ankogel 
Jochspitze 
Schwarzkopf 
Zsigmondyspitze 
Preimlspitz 
Steinerne Mandln 
Winkelspitz 
Oberlercherspitze 
Kordonspitze 
Kleiner Ankogel 
Säuleck 
Großer Hafner 
Elendköpfe 
Großer Sonnblick 
Lanischeck 
Kleiner Hafner 
Schneewinkelspitze 
Tischlerkarkopf 
Tischlerspitze 
Grubenkarkopf 
Mittlerer Sonnblick

References

Sources 
 Liselotte Buchenauer, Peter Holl: Alpenvereinsführer Ankogel- und Goldberggruppe. Bergverlag Rudolf Rother, Munich, 1986.

External links 

 
Mountains of Carinthia (state)
Mountains of Salzburg (state)